Brent Frewen (born 20 October 1977) is a former Australian rules footballer who played for Fitzroy in the Australian Football League (AFL) in 1996. He was recruited from the South Mildura Football Club in the Sunraysia Football League with the 4th selection in the 1996 Pre-season Draft.	 He was Fitzroy's final ever selection in an AFL Draft.

References

External links

Living people
1977 births
Fitzroy Football Club players
Australian rules footballers from Victoria (Australia)